The Rural Municipality of Clinworth No. 230 is a rural municipality (RM) in the Canadian province of Saskatchewan within Census Division No. 8 and  Division No. 3.

History 
The RM of Clinworth No. 230 incorporated as a rural municipality on December 9, 1912.

Geography

Communities and localities 
The following urban municipalities are surrounded by the RM.

Villages
 Sceptre

The following unincorporated communities are within the RM.

Localities
 Lemsford, dissolved as a village, January 1, 1951
 Portreeve, dissolved as a village, December 31, 1972

Demographics 

Attractions 
 Lemsford Ferry Regional Park
 Lemsford Ferry
 Great Sandhills Ecological Reserve
 Great Sand Hills Museum - Sceptre
 Lancer Centennial Museum

Government 
The RM of Clinworth No. 230 is governed by an elected municipal council and an appointed administrator that meets on the second Thursday of every month. The reeve of the RM is Krista Loudon while its administrator is Sherry Egeland. The RM's office is located in Sceptre.

Transportation 
 Saskatchewan Highway 32
 Saskatchewan Highway 649
 Canadian Pacific Railway
 Lemsford Ferry

Notable people 
Harry Whiteside

See also 
List of rural municipalities in Saskatchewan

References 

C